The 2022 UNLV Rebels football team represented the University of Nevada, Las Vegas as a member of the Mountain West Conference during the 2022 NCAA Division I FBS football season. They are led by head coach Marcus Arroyo, who is in his third season with the team. The Rebels will play their home games at Allegiant Stadium in Paradise, Nevada.

On November 28, following a 5-7 season, Arroyo was fired. During his three seasons as UNLV's head coach, he went 7-23.

On December 6, 2022 the Las Vegas Review-Journal reported that Arkansas defensive coordinator Barry Odom would be named the new head coach at UNLV. On December 15, 2022, UNLV announced that Odom had hired Bobby Petrino as his offensive coordinator.

Previous season 
The Rebels finished the 2021 season 2–10, 2–6 in Mountain West play to finish in last place in the West division.

Schedule
UNLV and the Mountain West Conference announced the 2022 football schedule on February 16, 2022.

Game summaries

Idaho State

at California

North Texas

at Utah State

New Mexico

at San Jose State

Air Force

at Notre Dame

at San Diego State

Fresno State

at Hawaii

Nevada

References

UNLV
UNLV Rebels football seasons
UNLV Rebels football